Christian Haechler (born November 8, 1983 in Zurich) is a Swiss freestyle skier, specializing in  aerials.

Haechler competed at the 2010 Winter Olympics for Switzerland. He placed 16th in the qualifying round of the aerials event, failing to advance to the final.

As of March 2013, his best showing at the World Championships is 8th, in the 2011.

Haechler made his World Cup debut in March 2005. As of March 2013, his best World Cup event finish is 4th, in  2009/10. His best World Cup overall finish in aerials is 9th, in 2010/11.

References

1983 births
Living people
Olympic freestyle skiers of Switzerland
Freestyle skiers at the 2010 Winter Olympics
Sportspeople from Zürich
Swiss male freestyle skiers
21st-century Swiss people